Ledger is a command-line based double-entry bookkeeping application. Accounting data is stored in a plain text file, using a simple format, which the users prepare themselves using other tools. Ledger does not write or modify data, it only parses the input data and produces reports.

Reviews
Linux Weekly News editor Jonathan Corbet found Ledger to be a "powerful tool", particularly for generating reports, but that the software lacked many of the features necessary to scale to the needs of a small business. Joe Barr writing for Linux.com commented "If you're an MBA who groks Emacs and regular expressions, or a kernel hacker who appreciates tax deferred accruals, you'll love this application."

FLOSS Weekly interviewed John Wiegley in 2011. It noted reading of GnuCash files, scriptability, an Emacs interface and automated transactions as strong features as well as the Common Lisp port and the Haskell port of the system.

Ports

The Ledger system and file format have been quite influential, reimplemented in several other languages and inspiring similar tools. Actively developed ports include Abandon in Scala, Beancount in Python, and hledger in Haskell. Actively developed projects inspired by ledger include penny.

See also

 Comparison of accounting software

External links
Ledger homepage
Ledger and Text based Accounting 2009 presentation by Russell Adams

References

Free accounting software
Free software programmed in C++
Cross-platform software
Software using the BSD license